T. occidentalis may refer to several different species.  The specific epithet  means 'western.'

Talpa occidentalis, the Spanish mole
Telfairia occidentalis, a vine known as fluted gourd, fluted pumpkin, ugu, or ikong-ubong
Thespesius occidentalis, a dinosaur in the genus Thespesius
Thuja occidentalis, a tree known as northern white-cedar or eastern arborvitae
Titanites occidentalis, an ammonite in the genus Titanites
Torodora occidentalis, a moth in the family Lecithoceridae
Tradescantia occidentalis, a plant called the western spiderwort or prairie spiderwort
Triantha occidentalis, a carnivorous plant
Trichromia occidentalis, a moth in the family Erebidae
Trimeresurus occidentalis, a synonym for Trimeresurus gramineus, the bamboo pit viper
Triodopsis occidentalis, the western three-toothed land snail
Turpinia occidentalis, a tree known as muttonwood

See also
Taenaris cyclops occidentalis, a subspecies of the butterfly Taenaris cyclops
Thymelicus sylvatica occidentalis, a subspecies of the moth Thymelicus sylvatica
Tilia caroliniana subsp. occidentalis, a subspecies of the tree Tilia caroliniana